Ángel Rosario Cabada (1872–1921) was an agrarian leader whose name was given to a town and municipality in the Mexican state of Veracruz.

References

1872 births
1921 deaths
Mexican chemists
Mexican culture